Cheilymenia fimicola is a species of apothecial fungus belonging to the family Pyronemataceae.

This is a common European species appearing throughout the year as orange discs up to 5 mm in diameter, singly or clustered on dung, usually from cows.

The fungus grows as flat saucers without stipes. It has hairs resembling eyelashes. It is reddish-orange when young and lightens in age. It may be closely related to species of Aleuria. It is thought to probably be edible if cleaned thoroughly.

Similar species include Cheilymenia crucipila, Cheilymenia stercorea, and Cheilymenia theleboloides.

References

Further reading

Cheilymenia fimicola at Index Fungorum

Pyronemataceae
Fungi described in 1866